There were fifteen female and twenty-four male athletes representing the country at the 2000 Summer Paralympics, winning nine medals in total and with three of these being won by Mairead Berry.

Medal table

See also
Ireland at the 2000 Summer Olympics
Ireland at the Paralympics

References

Bibliography

External links
International Paralympic Committee

Nations at the 2000 Summer Paralympics
Paralympics
2000